Niños is the Spanish word for children.  The term may also refer to:

The Niños Héroes, six famous soldiers during the Mexican-American War.
Juego de Niños, a Mexican horror film.